John M. Pletcher is a retired United States Air Force major general who served as the deputy assistant secretary, for budget of the Office of the Assistant Secretary of the Air Force for Financial Management and Comptroller. Previously, he was the director of financial management of the Air Force Materiel Command.

References

External links

Year of birth missing (living people)
Living people
Place of birth missing (living people)
United States Air Force generals